Jimmie Lee Land, known as Buddy Ace (November 11, 1936 – December 25, 1994) was an American Texas blues singer, billed as the "Silver Fox of the Blues".

Biography
Born in Jasper, Texas, he was raised in Baytown near Houston, and began his career by singing gospel in a group that included Joe Tex. He joined up with other blues singers, Bobby "Blue" Bland and Junior Parker, before signing to Duke/Peacock Records in 1955 and agreeing to be credited as "Buddy Ace", a name previously used by the late Johnny Ace's brother, St. Clair Alexander.

He recorded a string of singles for the Duke label between 1956 and 1969. His hits included "Nothing in the World Can Hurt Me (Except You)", which reached number 25 on the Billboard R&B chart in 1966. His second and last hit in the R&B chart was in the following year, "Hold On (To This Old Fool)", which made number 33. His other well-known tracks included "Root Doctor" and "Pouring Water on a Drowning Man".

In the late 1960s, he moved to California, living in Los Angeles, Oakland, and Sacramento, and continuing to perform live shows. He also continued to record, for Paula, Evejim, and several smaller labels. He billed himself "The Silver Fox of the Blues" after his hair turned white in his forties.

Buddy Ace died of a heart attack aged 58, while performing in Waco, Texas, early on Christmas Day, 1994.

Selected discography

Singles
 "Screaming Please" / "What Can I Do" Duke 346
 "True Love Money Can't Buy" / "My Love" Duke 381
 "It's Gonna Be Me" / "Nothing in the World Can Hurt Me (Except You)" Duke 397
 "Love Of Mine" / "Don't Hurt No More" Blues-B-Us 2016

Albums
 Don't Hurt Me No More – Evejim Records 2018 (1994) Also issued under title Root Doctor
 Buddy Ace, Silver Fox – Evejim Records 2040 (1994)
 From Me To You – Evejim Records 2048 (1995)
 The Real Thing – Jewel 5054 (1996)

Bibliography
Encyclopedia of The Blues. Edition 2006, Edward Komara. Routledge,

References

1936 births
1994 deaths
American blues singers
Singers from Texas
20th-century American singers
People from Jasper, Texas
20th-century American male singers